Kentoine Jennings (born 15 October 1971) is a Bermudian former footballer who played as a defender. He made 33 appearances for the Bermuda national team scoring twice.

Club career
Jennings played in the 1989 Bermudan FA Cup final for North Village Rams.

Jennings signed for English club Hereford United from PHC Zebras in 1990. Over the next two seasons, he made 16 appearances in the Football League, playing alongside compatriot Meshach Wade. They were spotted by manager John Sillett when playing their first international match against the United States.

He returned to Bermuda in 1993 to play with Vasco da Gama, before signing for North Village in 1999. In 2010, he played for Bermuda First Division side Prospect United.

International career
He made his debut for Bermuda in a February 1990 friendly match against the USA and earned a total of 33 caps, scoring 2 goals. He also captained the national team.

His final international match was a September 2006 CONCACAF Gold Cup qualification match against the Dominican Republic. He announced his international retirement in 2007.

Personal life
His younger brother is fellow footballer Kevin Jennings. He now works for the Bermuda Telephone Company.

Career statistics
Scores and results list Bermuda's goal tally first, score column indicates score after each Jennings goal.

References

External links

1971 births
Living people
Association football central defenders
Bermudian footballers
Bermuda international footballers
PHC Zebras players
Hereford United F.C. players
North Village Rams players
English Football League players
Bermudian expatriate footballers
Expatriate footballers in England